FC Lokomotiv Saint Petersburg was a Russian football team from Saint Petersburg. It played professionally in 1969 and from 1992 to 2000, including 5 seasons (1996 to 2000) in the second-highest Russian First Division. In 1996 the team merged with FC Saturn-1991 Saint Petersburg and played for one season as FC Lokomotiv-Saturn Saint Petersburg.

Reserve squad
Lokomotiv's reserve squad played professionally as FC Lokomotiv-d St. Petersburg in the Russian Third League in 1996–1997.

External links
  Team history at KLISF

 
Association football clubs established in 1936
Association football clubs disestablished in 2006
Defunct football clubs in Saint Petersburg
Saint Petersburg
1936 establishments in Russia
2006 disestablishments in Russia